Apiocystis is a genus of algae belonging to the family Tetrasporaceae.

The species of this genus are found in Europe and Northern America.

Species:

Apiocystis brauniana 
Apiocystis lacustris

References

Chlamydomonadales
Chlamydomonadales genera